Hiroki Moriya was the defending champion, but decided not to participate this year.

Vincent Millot won the title, defeating Philip Bester 6–4, 6–4 in the final.

Seeds

Draw

Finals

Top half

Bottom half

References
Main Draw
Qualifying Draw

Challenger Banque Nationale de Granby
Challenger de Granby